is a Japanese gymnast. She competed in six events at the 1984 Summer Olympics.

References

External links
 

1968 births
Living people
Japanese female artistic gymnasts
Olympic gymnasts of Japan
Gymnasts at the 1984 Summer Olympics
Place of birth missing (living people)
20th-century Japanese women